Søndre and Nordre Fasanvej (literally South and North Pheasant Road) are two streets which form a long south--to-north oriented artery through Frederiksberg, an independent municipality surrounded by larger Copenhagen Municipality in Copenhagen, Denmark.  The southern part of the street is surrounded by large green spaces and attractive residential neighbourhoods  while its northern part, which enters the Nørrebro and North-West districts of Copenhagen, is dominated by former industry. The street takes its name after Fasangården, a former royal pheasantry, in Frederiksberg Park.

Location
Søndre Fasanvej begins at Valby Langgade and continues along the western margin of Søndermarken and Frederiksberg Gardens to Smallegade, passing Roskildevej on the way. It then continues as Nordre Fasanvej, passing several major arteries, including Nylandsvej, Godthåbsvej, Borups Allé and Hillerødgade, before reaching Frederikssundsvej.

History
The oldest part of Søndre Fasanvej, north of Roskildevej, was established in 1682 as an access road to the royal pheasantry behind Frederiksberg Gardens. The road was later extended northwards to Smallegade. The southern part of present-day Søndre Fasanvej, between Valby Langgade and Roskildevej, was created in about 1870 as a driveway to a small cluster of nurseries. It was first known as Bag Søndermarken (literally "Behind Søndermarken") but was incorporated in Søndre Fasanvej in about 1900.

In 1884, Nordre Fasanvej was extended northwards to Gofthåbsvej. From there, it continued as Østre Fasanvej to the new street Golger Danskes Vej. It was a few years later continued in stages by private landowner Niels Josefsen as part of his Mariendal estate all the way to Hillerødgade (then Lyngbygade)-

Many of the new buildings along the road were industrial enterprises. The Royal Porcelain Factory had acquired the site at the corner of Søndre Fasanvej and Smallegade in 1884. Frederiksberg Papaer Factory (No. 43) was established by Jean Christian Ferslew in 1881 as a supplier of paper for his growing newspaper empire. In 1892, German Jrüger inaugurated a new tobacco factory at Østre Fasanvej 32. The products were sold from G. Jrüger's tobacco shop at Købmagergade 6769. The department store Messen operated a curtain factory a little further down the road. Slagterstiftelsen was built by the Butchers' Guild to provide affordable accommodation for elderly, needy butchers. Hoffunktionærenes Alderdomshjem was a retirement home for retired court officials.

In 1908. Copenhagen Municipality continued Østre Fasanvej northwards to Frederikssundsvej. In 1918, Østre Fasanvej was merged into Nordre Fasanvej The section north of Godthåbsvej was until 1920 called Østre Fasanvej (East Pheasant Road).

A new Frederiksberg Hospital was built at the street in 1903, replacing the old hospital at Howitzvej.

Notable buildings and residents

The west side of Søndre Fasanvej, opposite the big parks, is dominated by areas of Single-family detached homes, apartment buildings from the 1880s. Diakonissestiftelsen's development, located on the corner with Peter Bangs Vej, dates from the same time. Across the street from Diakonissestiftelsen is the former industrial site of the Royal Copenhagen porcelain manufactury, which has been transformed  into a mixed-use neighbourhood now known as Porcelænshaven (literally "The Porcelain Garden"). The main entrance to Frederiksberg Hospital is located at No. 57. Its gatehouse is built in the Neo-Baroque style.

Nordre Fasanvej is home to some early examples of Functionalist architecture. The Green Funkis Building at No. 78 was built in 1932 to designs by Hans Dahlerup-Berthelsen. The company Novozymes has a factory at the Nørrebro end of Nordre Fasanvej. The oldest part of the complex is an old dairy where the enzyme production started. It was later expanded by Arne Jacobsen in 1934 and again in 1962. P. Wulff's former cigar factory is located at No. 111-115.

Public art
In front of the former Royal Porcelain Factory Main Building on Søndre Fasanvej stands Georg Jensen's bronze sculpture En høstmand (1915).

Transport

The underground Fasanvej Station is located at the southern end of Nordre Fasanvej. halfway between Smallegade and Nyelandsvej. It serves the M1 and M2 lines of the Copenhagen Metro.

Nørrebro station is located at Frederikssundsvej at the northern end of the street. It serves the Ring Line of the S-train network.

Gallery

See also
 Frederiksberg Allé
 Borups Allé
 Søndre Fasanvej

References

External links

Streets in Copenhagen
Streets in Frederiksberg